Kurt Eigenstiller (11 April 1928 – 11 July 2015) was an Austrian footballer. He played in one match for the Austria national football team in 1954.

References

External links
 
 

1928 births
2015 deaths
Austrian footballers
Austria international footballers
Place of birth missing
Association football forwards
Grazer AK players
First Vienna FC players
SK Vorwärts Steyr players